Sri Venkateswara Mahatmyam is 1960 Indian Telugu-language Hindu mythological film directed by P. Pullaiah and produced by V. Venkateswarlu. It is based on the Venkateswara avatar of Vishnu at Tirumala. It stars N. T. Rama Rao, Savitri, and S. Varalakshmi with music composed by Pendyala Nageswara Rao. The film was dubbed into Tamil and released as Srinivasa Kalyanam.

Plot 
The film begins with the advent of Kali Yuga, the earth faces threats of all sorts. To reduce its burden, Saptharishis, helmed by Kasyapa Muni perform a Yagna, Narada Maharshi arrives there and asks who the patron deity of the sacrifice is. Unable to answer, the sages send Bhrigu Maharshi to test Trimurthi's. After testing Lord Siva and Brahma, he reaches Vaikuntha when the Lord Vishnu and his consort Lakshmi are in a playful mood and ignore Bhrigu. Angered by this, Bhrigu kicks Vishnu on the chest. To pacify the sage, Vishnu held his legs and pressed the eye in his foot the symbol of his egotism, when the sage realises his folly and apologise to Vishnu. But Lakshmi gets upset and in anger, leaves to the earth. Vishnu also follows her and settles in an anthill without food & water. Taking pity, Brahma and Shiva assumed the forms of a cow and calf to serve him. Lakshmi in guise sells them to the king. Discovering Vishnu on the ant-hill, the cow thus fed him. Meanwhile, at the palace, the cow does not yield any milk, for which the queen chastised the royal cow herder Sarabha severely. To learn the cause, Sarabha follows the cow secretly and discovers its deed. Angered Sarabha flung his ax but Vishnu rose from the ant-hill to receive the blow then he curses Sarabha to roam as a ghost until he forms as a deity at that place.

After that, Vishnu reaches to his ardent devotee Vakulamatha's ashram, she names him as Srinivasa and he starts staying with her. Once Srinivasa on a hunt chases a wild elephant. In its pursuit, he was led into a garden, where he meets Padmavati, daughter of Aakasa Raju and both of them fall in love. After initial hesitation, Aakasa Raju and his wife Dharani Devi agrees to their marriage. For the marriage expenses, Srinivasa takes debt from Kubera and promises to repay the loan with interest till the end of Kali Yuga. After the marriage, Sage Narada informed Lakshmi about the wedding, then fuming, Lakshmi confronts Vishnu. The clash between his two consorts leads Srinivasa, to turn himself into stone form. Padmavathi and Lakshmi also become stone on his either side and Vakula Devi as a garland. Everyone is happy that the deity is revealed to protect the earth. Generations pass by, Once a devotee called Bhavaji arrives and starts calling the deity as Balaji. But he is not been allowed to watch the Lord. There onwards, every night the Lord himself visits to play dice with him. One day, Lord Balaji loses his ornament in the bet. Next day, when the temple doors are opened, people observe the ornament is missing. The King arrives to conduct an interrogation and Bhavaji explains the truth. But no one believes it, so the King conducts a test to prove his innocence, keeps him in a prison, full of sugar cane inside, and asks him to eat all of it before dawn. Lord Venkateswara arrives in the form of an elephant and finishes it within moments. In the morning, the people are surprised to see the miracle. Thereafter, Bhavaji is called by the name Hathiram Bhavaji and the king endorse the temple authority to him. At last, generations pas and the number of devotees increases to the temple. Finally, the movie ends by showing the Srivari Brahmotsavam.

Cast 

N. T. Rama Rao as Vishnu / Venkateswara
S. Varalakshmi as Lakshmi
Savitri as Padmavathi
V. Nagayya as Hathiram Bhavaji
Gummadi as Bhrigu Maharshi
Relangi
Ramana Reddy as Sarabha
Rajanala
Vangara
Valluri Balakrishna
Peketi Sivaram
P. Suri Babu as Narada Maharshi
Ghantasala as Guest role in the song
Sr. A V Subbarao as Akasa Raju
Jr. A V Subbarao as Lord Brahma
Vempati Peda Satyam as Lord Siva
Lanka Satyam as Yatrikudu
Rushyendramani as Dhaaranidevi
Santha Kumari as Vakula Devi
Showkar Janaki as Yerukalasani
Surabhi Balasaraswathi as Sarabha's wife
Sandhya as Goddess Saraswathi

Soundtrack 

Music composed by Pendyala Nageshwara Rao. Music released by Audio Company.

Box office and impact 
It released with twenty prints and had a 100-day run in 16 centers and 175 days in Hyderabad and Vijayawada centers. The deification of Rama Rao began and his residence in Madras became a shrine for pilgrims, who would visit him after a trip to Tirupati. NTR fans waited in long queues outside his house for a darshan of their "living god". They used to apprise him of their problems back home in their villages and he listened to them patiently before rushing to the studio in the morning.

References

External links 
 

1960 films
1960s Telugu-language films
Hindu mythological films
Films scored by Pendyala Nageswara Rao
Films directed by P. Pullayya